Construction of the Royal City Curling Club in New Westminster, British Columbia, Canada, began in August 1965, and was completed in January 1966.  The club's first president was George Reid, and its first ice maker was Don Bowman. Since its completion, renovations have been done on it twice, once in 1987 and again in 1994.

National Representatives From Royal City CC 
1972 - BC & Canadian Mixed Champion - Trev Fisher
1974 - BC Mixed Champion - Bill Kennedy
1980 - BC Ladies Champion - Joan Dexter
1985 - Senior Women's Champion - Lou Logan
1987 - BC Junior Men's Champion - Brent Pierce
1992 - BC Men's Champion - Jim Armstrong
1995 - BC Ladies Champion - Marla Geiger
1995 - BC Senior Men's Champion - Wayne Matthewson
1996 - Men's & Ladies' Deaf Curling Champions
1996 - BC Senior Men's Champion - Ed Dezura
1997 - BC Senior Men's Champion - Wayne Matthewson
1998 - BC Men's Champion - Greg McAulay
2000 - BC, Canadian & World Men's Champion - Greg McAulay
2000 - BC Master Men's Champion - Trev Fisher
2001 - BC Junior Men's Champion - Andrew Bilesky
2001 - Canadian Olympic Trials Champion - Kelley Law
2002 - BC Senior Men's Champion - Jamie McTavish
2002 - Olympic Bronze Medalists - Kelley Law Team
2004 - BC Juvenile Women's Champion - Kayla Chandler
2004 - BC Senior Ladies / Canadian Runner-up - Kathy Smiley
2004 - BC Ladies Champions - Georgina Wheatcroft
2004 - BC Men's Champions / Brier Semifinalist - Jay Peachey
2005 - BC Senior Ladies/Canadian Runner-up -  Kathy Smiley
2005 - BC Senior Men's  Champions - Jamie McTavish
2006 - Canadian Deaf Curling Champions - Bob Collins
2007 - Canadian Deaf Curling Champions - Bob Collins
2007 - BC Master Men's Champions - Hank Enns
2007 - BC Master Women's Champions - Eleanor Pierce
2007 - BC Senior Women's Champions / Canadian Runner-up - Kathy Smiley
2007 - BC Ladies Champions - Kelley Law
2008 - BC Mixed Champions - Bryan Miki
2008 - BC Junior Men's Champions - Jay Wakefield
2008 - BC & Canadian Master Men's Champions - Rick Pughe
2009 - BC Mixed Champions - Greg Monkman
2009 - BC Men's Champions - Sean Geall
2009 - BC Senior Women's Champions / Canadian Runner-up - Kathy Smiley
2009 - BC Masters Men's Champions / Canadian Runner-up - Rick Pughe
2009 - BC Master Women's Champions - Carol McFadden
2012 - BC Master Men's Champions - Rick Pughe
2013 - BC Mixed Doubles Champions - Tyler Tardi / Dezaray Hawes
2013 - BC Men's Champions - Andrew Bilesky
2014 - BC Junior Women's Champions / Canadian Runner-up - Kalia Van Osch
2014 - BC Juvenile Women's Champions - Dezaray Hawes
2014 - BC Juvenile Men's Champions - Brayden Carpenter
2015 - BC Juvenile Men's Champions / Optimist International Semi-Finalists - Matthew McCrady
2015 - BC Mixed Doubles Champions - Tyler Tardi / Dezaray Hawes
2015 - BC Mixed Champions - Dean Joanisse
2016 - BC Junior Men's Champions / Canadian Bronze Medalists - Tyler Tardi
2016 - BC Junior Women's Champions / Canadian Runner-up - Sarah Daniels
2016 - BC Juvenile Men's Champions / Optimist International Bronze Medalists - Matthew McCrady

Major Events Hosted at Royal City CC 
1997 - Canadian Police National Championship
2000 - B.C. Safeway Select
2001 - JVC Women's Skins Game

References 
The Royal City Curling Club

Curling clubs in Canada
New Westminster
1966 establishments in British Columbia